Kmita Zabierzów is a multi-sports club, best known for its football section, based in Zabierzów, Lesser Poland, Poland. The club belongs to the LZS sports clubs' union. The club's colors are white and black.

Achievements
 3 seasons at the second tier of Polish association football: 2006–07 (14th), 2008–08 (15th), 2008–09 (18th)

History
The club was founded in 1936 as an affiliate club of Wisła Kraków. After World War II, its name was changed first to LZS Zabierzowianka, and then to LKS Kmita.

In 2007, the club signed a contract with Gellwe, the manufacturer of the Tiger energy drink and has been playing as "Tiger Kmita" from March to October 2007.

In 2011, a new association, initially called Akademia Piłkarska 2011 Zabierzów, was founded. In January 2014, its current name, Akademia Piłkarska Kmita Zabierzów was adopted as the name Kmita is widely recognized in the football circles in Poland.

League history

In the 2000/01 season, the club finished 6th in the Kraków group of the Liga okręgowa, the fifth tier of Polish association football at the time, 16 points behind the leader, Puszcza Niepołomice. However, from the following season, the club started to steadily progress up the league ladder. They won the fifth tier in 2002/03 with a ten-point advantage over the second team. The following season, Kmita won the fourth tier competition with a 20-point advantage, progressed through playoffs against Okocimski Brzesko and was promoted to the third division. At the third tier, Kmita finished 5th in 2004/05 before winning the league in 2005/06 and being promoted to the II liga, the second tier.

In the 2006/07 edition of the II liga, Kmita only managed to finish 14th out 18 clubs. This resulted in them having to participate in playoffs against Pelikan Łowicz which Kmita lost. However, the club wasn't relegated due to Pogoń Szczecin which was to participate in the second-tier competition being denied the license to do so. Hence, despite losing the playoffs, Kmita remained at the second tier and finished 15th next season.

Kmita started the 2008/09 season in the 'I liga'. However, it was forced to withdraw at the halfway stage of the season due to the fact that the main sponsor decided to cease financing Kmita and move to another club.

Following the withdrawal from the second tier, Kmita joined the III liga (fourth division). After a mid-table finish in 2009/10, the club started to experience financial problems again what led to some players from team's the first squad leaving the club before the next season started. More followed during the winter break. In March 2011, before the start of the spring round, the club withdrew from the fourth tier competition due to being unable to pay the debts it owed to the tax authorities and other institutions.

The new association has been playing in the liga okręgowa'', the sixth tier league, since the 2011/12 season.

Notes

References

External links 
 Official website

 
Association football clubs established in 1936
1936 establishments in Poland
Kraków County